Nicole Karen Charcopa Sevillano (born 1 April 2000) is an Ecuadorian footballer who plays as a midfielder for CD El Nacional and the Ecuador women's national team.

International career
Charcopa capped for Ecuador at senior level during the 2018 Copa América Femenina.

References

2000 births
Living people
Sportspeople from Guayaquil
Ecuadorian women's footballers
Women's association football midfielders
C.D. Cuenca Femenino players
Ecuador women's international footballers
21st-century Ecuadorian women